Norwegian Bliss is a cruise ship for Norwegian Cruise Line, which entered service on 21 April 2018. The ship was built by Meyer Werft in Papenburg, Germany. The ship had a schedule of debuting in Alaska, United States in June 2018, and is designed for improved energy efficiency to meet Alaska's environmental regulations.

History 
Norwegian Cruise Line placed an order for a third Breakaway Plus cruise ship in July 2014. Construction started with steel cutting on 28 October 2016.

On 29 November 2017, nationally syndicated radio and digital personality Elvis Duran was announced as her sponsor. Duran hosts the morning talk radio show, Elvis Duran and the Morning Show. On-air, Duran also made the entire morning show (along with himself) "godparents" of the ship. Duran is the third godfather to any Norwegian vessel, only behind Pitbull and Wang Leehom, who sponsored sister ships Norwegian Escape and Norwegian Joy.

Norwegian Bliss float-out was on 17 February 2018. The ship was towed from the building dock and berth at the outfitting pier to get her funnel.

The ship was delivered to NCL on 21 April 2018 when the CEO of NCL, Andy Stuart, signed the ship documents where Norwegian Cruise Lines Holdings Limited took possession of the ship and started her inaugural voyage later on in the day. She reached North America, approaching New York in the overnight hours of 3 May 2018. The next day, a remote broadcast of Elvis Duran and his morning show took place. While sailing to Seattle, Washington from New York, Norwegian Bliss passed through the Panama Canal and became the largest cruise ship to ever transit it. The ship arrived in Seattle on 30 May 2018, and was officially christened later that same day.

Design 

Norwegian Bliss has 20 decks and 2,220 cabins, and can carry 4,000 passengers.

The hull art for Norwegian Bliss was designed by marine wildlife artist Robert Wyland. Wyland is best known for his "Whaling Wall" murals, in which he painted life-sized whales on 100 buildings all over the world.

Norwegian Bliss sailed on her inaugural cruise on 21 April 2018. Norwegian Bliss sailed on Mexican Riviera cruises from Los Angeles, California and cruises from Miami, Florida for her 2018 winter/spring season. For her 2019–2020 winter season, Norwegian Bliss sailed out from Manhattan, New York replacing her sister ship, Norwegian Escape, which moved back to Miami. Norwegian Bliss will sail to the Bahamas and eastern Florida, as well as longer cruises to the Caribbean, before repositioning to Seattle to resume cruising around Alaska in the summer of 2020.

The engines are equipped with scrubbers and a heat recovery systems for improved energy efficiency.

Ship amenities 
Norwegian Bliss has various themed dining areas and bars. The Olivier Award nominated musical, Six and Tony Award winning musical, Jersey Boys currently play in repertory on the ship. The Bliss and the Encore each have an electric go-kart track.

Route
Following the christening, she sailed Alaska cruises with the first departure occurring on 2 June 2018, then at New York. On 24 October 2018, on a Diverted Baja Peninsular (Originally Mexican Rivera) cruise, she visited San Diego for the first time. The vessel began sailing in November 2018 from Miami.

Incidents

Coronavirus pandemic 

On 18 March 2020, it was reported that Norwegian Cruise Line had sent a letter to passengers who had booked a cruise on Norwegian Bliss that "a 2-year-old who traveled aboard the vessel on 1 March 2020 voyage of the Norwegian Bliss tested positive for COVID-19. Although passengers receiving that letter stated that they wanted to reschedule, Norwegian Cruise Line refused to honor their requests. As a result, some people who decided not to embark on the cruise lost thousands of dollars, while others who chose to risk infection by joining the cruise ended up displaying symptoms of the disease while on the cruise.

Notes

References

External links 

 Official website

Ships built in Papenburg
Ships of Norwegian Cruise Line
2018 ships